NCAA volleyball may refer to:

 NCAA Women's Volleyball Championship
 NCAA Volleyball Championship (Philippines)
 NCAA Men's National Collegiate Volleyball Championship
 NCAA Men's Division III Volleyball Championship
 NCAA Beach Volleyball Championship
 NCAA Beach Volleyball Championship (Philippines)
 Molten Division III Men's Invitational Volleyball Championship Tournament